Rhadinosticta banksi is an Australian species of damselfly in the family Isostictidae,
commonly known as the northern wiretail.

It prefers fresh water streams and pools. The adult is a small to medium-sized damselfly with a length of 35 to 40mm, with the hindwing 20 to 25mm. They are dull in colour with a bluish thorax and may have pruinescence toward the end of the abdomen. In Australia, the distribution is in suitable habitat from Broome, Western Australia, across the north of the continent to the southern Queensland border. The taxon has been assessed in the IUCN Red List as least concern.

Notes 
The taxonomic difference between Rhadinosticta banksi and Rhadinosticta handschini is uncertain. They may not be separate species.

Gallery

References

Isostictidae
Odonata of Australia
Insects of Australia
Endemic fauna of Australia
Taxa named by Robert John Tillyard
Insects described in 1913
Damselflies